Hartford County is a county located in the north central part of the U.S. state of Connecticut. According to the 2020 census, the population was 899,498, making it the second-most populous county in Connecticut. Hartford County contains the city of Hartford, the state capital of Connecticut and the county's most populous city, with 121,054 residents at the 2020 census. Hartford County is included in the Hartford-East Hartford-Middletown metropolitan statistical area.

History
Hartford County was one of four original counties in Connecticut established on May 10, 1666, by an act of the Connecticut General Court. The act establishing the county states:
This Court orders that the Townes on the River from yee
north bounds of Windsor wth Farmington to ye south end of
ye bounds of Thirty Miles Island shalbe & remaine to be one
County wch shalbe called the County of Hartford. And it
is ordered that the County Court shalbe kept at Hartford on
the 1st Thursday in March and on the first Thursday in September yearely.

As established in 1666, Hartford County consisted of the towns of Windsor, Wethersfield, Hartford, Farmington, and Middletown. The "Thirty Miles Island" referred to in the constituting Act was incorporated as the town of Haddam in 1668. In 1670, the town of Simsbury was established, extending Hartford County to the Massachusetts border. In the late 17th to early 18th centuries, several more towns were established and added to Hartford County: Waterbury in 1686 (transferred to New Haven County in 1728), Windham in 1694 (transferred to Windham County in 1726), Hebron in 1708 (transferred to Tolland County in 1785), Coventry in 1712 (transferred to Windham County in 1726), and Litchfield in 1722 (transferred to Litchfield County in 1751).

In 1714, all of the unincorporated territory north of the towns of Coventry and Windham in northeastern Connecticut to the Massachusetts border were placed under the jurisdiction of Hartford County. Windham County was constituted in 1726, resulting in Hartford County losing the towns of Windham, Coventry, Mansfield (incorporated in 1702), and Ashford (incorporated in 1714). Northwestern Connecticut, which was originally placed under the jurisdiction of New Haven County in 1722, was transferred to Hartford County by 1738. All of northwestern Connecticut was later constituted as the new Litchfield County in 1751. In 1785, two more counties were established in what was now the U.S. state of Connecticut: Tolland and Middlesex. This mostly resulted in the modern extent of Hartford County. In the late 18th and early 19th centuries, the establishment of several more towns resulted in minor adjustments in the bounds of the county. The final adjustment resulting in the modern limits occurred on May 8, 1806, when the town of Canton was established.

Geography
It is the second-largest county in Connecticut by land area.

The county is divided into two unequal parts by the Connecticut River, and watered by Farmington, Mill, Podunk, Scantic, and other rivers. The surface is very diverse: part of the river valleys are alluvial and subject to flooding, while other portions of the county are hilly and even mountainous.

Adjacent counties
Hampden County, Massachusetts (north)
Tolland County (east)
New London County (southeast)
Middlesex County (south)
New Haven County (southwest)
Litchfield County (west)

Communities

In Connecticut, there is no county-level executive or legislative government; the counties determine probate, civil and criminal court boundaries, but little else. Each city or town is responsible for local services such as schools, snow removal, sewers, fire department and police departments. In Connecticut, cities and towns may agree to jointly provide services or establish a regional school system.

Cities

Bristol
Hartford
New Britain

Towns

Avon
Berlin
Bloomfield
Burlington
Canton
East Granby
East Hartford
East Windsor
Enfield
Farmington
Glastonbury
Granby
Hartland
Manchester
Marlborough
Newington
Plainville
Rocky Hill
Simsbury
South Windsor
Southington
Suffield
West Hartford
Wethersfield
Windsor
Windsor Locks

Demographics

2000 census
As of the census of 2000, there were 857,183 people, 335,098 households, and 222,505 families living in the county. The racial makeup of the county was 76.90% White, 11.66% Black or African American, 0.23% Native American, 2.42% Asian, 0.04% Pacific Islander, 6.43% from other races, and 2.31% from two or more races. 11.55% of the population were Hispanic or Latino of any race. 15.2% were of Italian, 11.2% Irish, 9.1% Polish, 6.5% English, 5.7% French and 5.3% German ancestry. 78.4% spoke English, 10.3% Spanish, 2.6% Polish, 1.9% French and 1.6% Italian as their first language.

There were 335,098 households, out of which 31.30% had children under the age of 18 living with them, 49.20% were married couples living together, 13.50% had a female householder with no husband present, and 33.60% were non-families. 27.90% of all households were made up of individuals, and 10.70% had someone living alone who was 65 years of age or older.  The average household size was 2.48 and the average family size was 3.05.

In the county, the population was spread out, with 24.60% under the age of 18, 7.80% from 18 to 24, 29.80% from 25 to 44, 23.20% from 45 to 64, and 14.70% who were 65 years of age or older. The median age was 38 years. For every 100 females, there were 92.70 males. For every 100 females age 18 and over, there were 89.00 males.

The median income for a household in the county was $50,756, and the median income for a family was $62,144. Males had a median income of $43,985 versus $33,042 for females. The per capita income for the county was $26,047. About 7.10% of families and 9.30% of the population were below the poverty line, including 12.90% of those under age 18 and 7.60% of those age 65 or over.

2010 census
As of the 2010 United States Census, there were 894,014 people, 350,854 households, and 227,831 families living in the county. The racial makeup of the county was 72.4% white, 13.3% black, 4.2% Asian, 0.3% American Indian, 7.1% from other races, and 2.7% from two or more races. Those of Hispanic origin made up 15.3% of the population. In terms of ancestry, 15.9% were Italian, 15.6% were Irish, 10.7% were Polish, 9.4% were English, 8.8% were German, and 2.5% were American.

Of the 350,854 households, 31.9% had children under the age of 18 living with them, 46.0% were married couples living together, 14.5% had a female householder with no husband present, 35.1% were non-families, and 28.7% of all households were made up of individuals. The average household size was 2.47 and the average family size was 3.06. The median age was 39.9 years.

The median income for a household in the county was $62,590 and the median income for a family was $78,599. Males had a median income of $56,181 versus $44,273 for females. The per capita income for the county was $33,151. About 8.0% of families and 10.7% of the population were below the poverty line, including 15.3% of those under age 18 and 7.7% of those age 65 or over.

Demographic breakdown by town

Income

Data is from the 2010 United States Census and the 2006-2010 American Community Survey 5-Year Estimates.

Race
Data is from the 2007-2011 American Community Survey 5-Year Estimates, ACS Demographic and Housing Estimates, "Race alone or in combination with one or more other races."

Transportation

Major highways

Public transportation
Connecticut Transit Hartford

Politics
Prior to 1960, Hartford County was a Republican-leaning swing county in presidential elections. Since then, it has become solidly Democratic similar to most of New England, with the only Republicans to carry the county since then being Richard Nixon and Ronald Reagan in their 49-state landslide victories of 1972 and 1984, respectively.

|}

Education
School districts include:

K-12:
 Avon School District
 Berlin School District
 Bloomfield School District
 Bristol School District
 Canton School District
 East Granby School District
 East Hartford School District
 East Windsor School District
 Enfield School District
 Farmington School District
 Glastonbury School District
 Granby School District
 Hartford School District
 Manchester School District
 New Britain School District
 Newington School District
 Plainville School District
 Regional School District 10
 Rocky Hill School District
 Simsbury School District
 South Windsor School District
 Southington School District
 Suffield School District
 West Hartford School District
 Wethersfield School District
 Windsor School District
 Windsor Locks School District

Secondary districts:
 Regional High School District 08

Elementary districts:
 Hartland School District
 Marlborough School District

See also

National Register of Historic Places listings in Hartford County, Connecticut

References

External links
Hartford County Fire Emergency Plan and Fire School
National Register of Historic Places listing for Hartford Co., Connecticut
 Central Regional Tourism District

 

 
1666 establishments in Connecticut
1960 disestablishments in Connecticut
Populated places established in 1666
Greater Hartford